Furler is a surname.

Notable people with this surname
Sia Furler, Australian singer-songwriter
Bob Furler, Australian rules footballer
Hans Furler, German politician
Irina Furler, married name of Australian Russian diver Irina Lashko
Percy Furler, Australian rules footballer
Peter Furler, Australian musician

References